Philip Shaw may refer to:
 Philip A. Shaw, British philologist
 Philip Shaw (winemaker), Australian winemaker

See also
 Philip R. Shawe, American businessman